Seymour is a given name which may refer to:

People
Seymour Bathurst, 7th Earl Bathurst (1864–1943), British soldier and newspaper owner
Seymour Benzer (1921–2007), American physicist, molecular biologist and behavioral geneticist
Seymour Cassel (1935-2019), American actor
Seymour Cocks (1882–1953), British Labour Party Member of Parliament
Seymour Cray (1925–1996), American supercomputer architect and founder of Cray Research
Seymour Chwast (born 1931), American graphic designer, illustrator and type designer
Seymour Ginsburg (1927–2004), American computer scientist
Seymour Greenberg (1920–2006), American tennis player
Seymour Halpern (1913–1997), US Representative from New York
Seymour Hersh (born 1937), Pulitzer Prize-winning investigative journalist and author
Seymour Hicks (1871–1949), British actor, music hall performer, playwright, screenwriter, theatre manager and producer
Seymour King (1852–1933), English banker, mountaineer and Conservative politician
Seymour H. Knox I (1861–1915), American entrepreneur and businessman
Seymour H. Knox II (1898–1990), American philanthropist and art enthusiast
Seymour H. Knox III (1926–1996), American philanthropist and owner of the National Hockey League Buffalo Sabres team
Seymour P. Lachman (born 1933), New York politician and historian
Seymour Martin Lipset (1922–2006), American political sociologist
Seymour Melman (1917–2004), American professor, economist, writer and gadfly of the military-industrial complex
Seymour Nebenzal (1899–1961), German film producer
Seymour Nurse (1933-2019), Barbadian former cricketer
Seymour Papert (1928-2016), South Africa-born American mathematician, computer scientist and educator
Seymour Schulich (born 1940), Canadian businessman, investor, author and philanthropist
Seymour Siegel (1927–1988), American Conservative rabbi, professor and adviser to three US presidents
Seymour Stedman (1871–1948), American civil liberties lawyer and a leader of the Socialist Party of America
Seymour R. Thaler (1919–1976), New York state senator
Seymour Topping (1921-2020), American journalist and writer

Fictional characters
 Seymour d'Campus, University of Southern Mississippi mascot
 Seymour Glass, in the Glass Family series by J. D. Salinger
 Seymour Guado, in Final Fantasy X
 Seymour Krelborn, the main character in The Little Shop of Horrors
 Seymour Skinner, school principal in The Simpsons
 Seymour Utterthwaite, in Last of the Summer Wine, played by Michael Aldridge
 Seymour, lead character in the Seymour series of early 2D platform games by Codemasters
 Seymour (Futurama), Fry's dog in Futurama
 Seymour, the green fuzzy lead puppet in the 1970s children's television series Hot Fudge
 Seymour (Burn Notice), an eccentric arms dealer in the television series Burn Notice
 Seymour, a Muppet elephant who appeared on Muppets Tonight
 Seymour, in a series of 1990s video games by Codemasters, including Seymour Goes to Hollywood.
 Seymour, portrayed by Larry Vincent, a television horror host
 Seymour, a leopard head in Rick Riordan's Camp Half-Blood Chronicles, made alive by Dionysus

See also
 Seymour (disambiguation)
 Seymour (surname)
 Seymore